Duldurga (Duldarga) is a rural locality (a selo) and the administrative center of Duldurginsky District of Zabaykalsky Krai, Russia.

Geography
It is located on the right bank of the river Ilya, at the mouth of the river. Duldurga, 90 km to the south-west from the village Aginskoye, 115 km (along the highway) from the railway station. The city of Chita is 192 km away. The Alkhanay National Park is near the village. There is a library, a hospital complex and a school named "school of the year" on several occasions.

History
Duldurga was founded in 1803 by its first settler, P. Gusev. In 1937, it became the administrative center of the district. A timber cooperative was formed in 1963.

Demographics
Population:

References

Rural localities in Zabaykalsky Krai
1803 establishments in the Russian Empire